The 2017 King's Cup is an international football tournament that is currently being held in Thailand from 14 to 16 July 2017. The 4 national teams involved in the tournament are required to register a squad of 23 players.

Players marked (c) were named as captain for their national squad. Number of caps counts until the start of the tournament, including all FIFA-recognized pre-tournament friendlies. Player's age is their age on the opening day of the tournament.

Coach: Igor Kriushenko

The following 22 players were called up for the 2017 King's Cup on 10 July 2017.

Coach: Paulo Duarte

The following 22 players were called up for the 2017 King's Cup.

Coach: Jørn Andersen

The following 22 players were called up for the 2017 King's Cup.

Coach: Milovan Rajevac

The following 23 players were called up for the 2017 King's Cup on 13 July 2017.

References

King's Cup